Randolph House may refer to:

in the United States (by state then city)
Randolph-Whittle House, Macon, Georgia, listed on the National Register of Historic Places (NRHP) in Bibb County
Ephraim Fitz-Randolph House, Piscataway, New Jersey, listed on the NRHP in Middlesex County 
Frye-Randolph House and Fryemont Inn, Bryson City, North Carolina, listed on the NRHP in Swain County
Fitz Randolph-Rogers House, Hamilton, Ohio, listed on the NRHP in Butler County
Randolph House (Philadelphia, Pennsylvania), listed on the NRHP in Philadelphia County
Dr. Fredrich A. Randolph Block, Sioux Falls, South Dakota, listed on the NRHP in Minnehaha County 
William Randolph House, Cross Plains, Tennessee, listed on the NRHP in Robertson County
Randolph House (Memphis, Tennessee), listed on the National Register of Historic Places in Shelby County
Virginia Randolph Cottage, Glen Allen, Virginia, listed on the NRHP in Henrico County
Peyton Randolph House, Williamsburg, Virginia, listed on the NRHP